Ramgopalpur (Nepali: रामगोपालपुर ) is a municipality in Mahottari District in Madhesh Province (मधेश प्रदेश) of Nepal. It was formed in 2016 occupying current 9 sections (wards) from previous 9 former VDCs. It occupies an area of 39.54 km2 with a total population of 29,612.

References

Populated places in Mahottari District
Nepal municipalities established in 2017
Municipalities in Madhesh Province